Dora Hernández (born 15 July 1948) is a Mexican diver. She competed in the women's 10 metre platform event at the 1968 Summer Olympics.

References

External links
 

1948 births
Living people
Mexican female divers
Olympic divers of Mexico
Divers at the 1968 Summer Olympics
Divers from Mexico City